Balkumari Temple (Nepali: बालकुमारी मन्दिर) is located in Lalitpur District in Nepal. The origin of temple is controversial, but is supposed to have been built between 7 and 17th century. There is a pond near the temple which has been filled with silt and is under restoration.

The original idol of Balkumari was stolen and has not been recovered. The duplicate copy has also been stolen a few times but has been returned.

The temple is a starting point of Pyakhaa Jatra which ends after 3 days in Sunakothi. The festival occurs after about a month from Holi.

See also
List of Hindu temples in Nepal

References

Hindu temples in Lalitpur District, Nepal